Walter C. Willett (born June 20, 1945) is an American physician and nutrition researcher. He is the Fredrick John Stare Professor of Epidemiology and Nutrition at the Harvard School of Public Health and was the chair of its department of nutrition from 1991 to 2017. He is also a professor of medicine at Harvard Medical School.

Willett is the principal investigator of the second Nurses' Health Study (NHS2 or NHS II), a compilation of studies regarding the health of older women and their risk factors for major chronic diseases. He has published more than 1,500 scientific articles regarding various aspects of diet and disease and is the second most cited author in clinical medicine.

Willett is perhaps best known for his 2001 book Eat, Drink, and Be Healthy and the ensuing controversy over it. The book presents nutritional information and recommendations based on what was then the consensus of nutrition scientists, and is critical of many misconceptions about diet and nutrition, including ideas presented by guidelines from American organizations such as the USDA. Willett is frequently quoted by the media in articles regarding nutrition.

In 2016, Semantic Scholar AI program included Willett on its list of top ten most influential biomedical researchers.

Education

 Diploma 1963,  Okemos High School
 B.S. 1966, Michigan State University
 M.D. 1970, University of Michigan Medical School
 M.P.H. 1973, Harvard School of Public Health
 Dr.P.H. 1980, Harvard School of Public Health, Epidemiology
 Chair, 1991, Department of Nutrition, Harvard School of Public Health

Influence on Harvard meal plans and cafeterias

Willett has been actively involved in helping Harvard University food services to update their offerings along current nutritional guidelines. While his work has influenced the menu choices, students and Willett have noted that the menus still have a long way to go to reflect the currently available nutrition science.

Criticism
Willett's epidemiological research has been criticized by nutritionists and other researchers for promoting an "obesity paradox". They believe he lacks a rigorous scientific base and often has contradictory findings.

Willett has been a high-profile critic of research into the health risks of obesity by American epidemiologist Katherine Flegal and her colleagues at the Centers for Disease Control and Prevention's National Center for Health Statistics, going so far as to call it a "pile of rubbish ... No one should waste their time reading it." In 2013, the journal Nature ran an editorial rebuking Willett for the style and manner of his criticism, saying it misrepresented the complexity of the science involved and used inappropriate language in doing so.

In 2021, Flegal published an article in the journal Progress in Cardiovascular Diseases accusing Willett and some of his Harvard School of Public Health colleagues of being part of "an aggressive campaign that included insults, errors, misinformation, social media posts, behind-the-scenes gossip and maneuvers, and complaints to her employer." Flegal wrote that the goal Willett and his allies "appeared to be to undermine and discredit her work," and that, "The controversy was something deliberately manufactured, and the attacks primarily consisted of repeated assertions of preconceived opinions." Flegal also questioned Willett's competence to criticize her team's statistical research, as he "was not a statistician and had no expertise in estimating the number of deaths associated with obesity."

Works
 Nutritional Epidemiology (1998) 
 Eat, Drink, and be Healthy: The Harvard Medical School Guide To Healthy Eating (2005) 
 Eat, Drink, and Weigh Less (2007) 
 The Fertility Diet (2008) 
 More than 1,000 scientific articles

References

External links

 Transcript - The search for Optimal Diets: A Progress Report presented at the Honda Foundation
 Information on Eat, Drink, and be Healthy

1945 births
Living people
American nutritionists
American public health doctors
Diet food advocates
Michigan State University alumni
University of Michigan Medical School alumni
Harvard School of Public Health alumni
Harvard Medical School faculty
People from Hart, Michigan
Harvard School of Public Health faculty
People from Brookline, Massachusetts
Members of the National Academy of Medicine